Shoebite is an unreleased film and is the story of a man in his early 60s played by Amitabh Bachchan. The film is based on a story Labour Of Love by M. Night Shyamalan.  It is directed by Shoojit Sircar and produced by UTV Motion Pictures. The lyrics are penned by Gulzar.

During production, the movie was titled Johnny Mastana and later Johnny Walker.

Plot
Shoebite is the story of a man in his early 60s named John Pereira who sets out on a journey of self-discovery.

Cast
 Amitabh Bachchan as John Pereira
 Sarika as Aditi
 Shrysh Zutshi as Young John Pereira
 Sanjeeda Shaikh as Young Aditi
 Dia Mirza
 Jimmy Sheirgill
 Nawazuddin Siddiqui
 Apurva Mathur
 Preeti Nigam

Filming
During the Manali schedule of the film, the shooting unit converted the Snow and Avalanche Study Establishment(SASE) into a hospital.

Production
Percept Picture Company announced a film called Johnny Walker starring Bachchan and directed by Sircar, but the film was never made. Sircar took the film to UTV Motion Pictures, renaming it Shoebite. Percept filed a lawsuit against UTV seeking to prevent Shoebite from being made. After a long legal battle, the lawsuit was dismissed in 2012. The production of the film has been speculated to be stalled. The director of the film Shoojit Sircar made film Vicky Donor and got it released since he started to face delays in Shoebite. Sircar released Madras Cafe in 2013, and the film has now been cancelled. In March 2018, Bachchan requested the makers to release the film in his tweet, saying Yes... put aside the internal debate, issues, or personal view points and give this labour of love from Shoojit Sircar a chance for others to appreciate this novel story and film... Please..

References

External links
Article on oneindia.com

Unreleased Hindi-language films
Cancelled films
Films shot in Himachal Pradesh
Films directed by Shoojit Sircar
UTV Motion Pictures films